The Bible names over 120 species of animals by current interpretive standards.  The more a particular animal abounded in the Holy Land, the more frequent allusions to it may be found.

Species mentioned
A closer examination of the way in which references to animals are introduced, the frequency of allusions to certain species, and the date of the documents in which they are found gives a fair idea of the conditions of the area at different stages of its history.  The species, for instance, called in Hebrew 're'em', was very probably the aurochs, or wild ox and totally disappeared about the time of the Babylonian captivity.  The wild ass, the lion and a few others long ago became extinct in Palestine.  Other species alluded to in the Bible are now extremely scarce.

The Bible mentions animals from varying regions of the Middle East.  The ostrich, for instance, a denizen of the torrid regions, and the camel, of the waterless districts around Palestine, are mentioned side by side with the roebuck and deer of the woody summits of Lebanon.  This variety, greater probably in Palestine than in any other country in the same latitude, is attributed to the great extremes of elevation and temperature in this small area. Palestinian fauna is not as rich today as it was during the Biblical times. The land is barren today but was well wooded when the Bible was written, especially on the hills east of the Jordan River.

Recent excavations in the Timna Valley discovered what may be the earliest camel bones found in Israel or even outside the Arabian peninsula, dating to around 930 BCE. This is seen as evidence that the stories of Abraham, Joseph, Jacob and Esau were written after this time.

Classification of animals
Although no regular classification is to be sought for in the Bible, animal creation is there practically divided into four classes, often called kinds, according to the four different modes of locomotion.  Among the animals, some walk, others fly, many are essentially swimmers and several crawl on the ground.  This classification, more empiric than logical, would not by any means satisfy a modern scientist.  It must be known, however, if we wish fairly to understand the language of the Scriptures on the matters connected therewith.  The first class, the beasts, in the Biblical parlance, includes all large, walking animals, with the exception of the amphibia, such small animals as moles, mice and the like, and humans as they were not classified as animals.

Beasts are divided into cattle, or domesticated (behemoth in the strict sense), and beasts of the field, i.e. wild animals.  The fowls, which constitute the second class, include not only the birds, but also "all things that fly", even if they "go upon four feet", as the different kinds of locusts.  Of the many "living beings that swim in the water" no particular species is mentioned; the "great whales" are set apart in that class, while the rest are divided according to whether they have, or have not, fins and scales (Leviticus 11:9, 10).

The reptiles, or "creeping things", form the fourth class.  References to this class are relatively few.  However, it should be noticed that the "creeping things" include not only the reptiles properly so called, but also all short-legged animals or insects which seem to crawl rather than to walk, such as moles, lizards, etc.  From a religious viewpoint, all these animals are divided into two classes, clean and unclean, according to whether they can, or cannot, be eaten.

See also

Historicity of the Bible
List of animals in the Bible

References

The Animals' Bible lists in detail every animal listed in the Bible from Genesis to Revelation including those additional books found in Roman Catholic and Orthodox Bibles that are known to Protestants as the Apocrypha. It also draws on relevant Old and New Testament extra-Biblical writings and the Jewish Mishnah as reference. Comes with a comprehensive Subject Index. The Animals' Bible - Author Ian A. Stuart - Editor Kathy Hall - Country Canada - Genre Religious - Pages 499 -